Psammocora is a genus of stony coral in the monotypic family Psammocoridae. Species of this genus are also known as cat's paw coral.

Species
Psammocora albopicta Benzoni, 2006
Psammocora contigua (Esper, 1794)
Psammocora digitata Milne Edwards & Haime, 1851
Psammocora eldredgei Randall, 2015
Psammocora haimiana Milne Edwards & Haime, 1851
Psammocora nierstraszi Van der Horst, 1921
Psammocora profundacella Gardiner, 1898
Psammocora stellata (Verrill, 1866)

References

Scleractinia
Scleractinia genera